is a 1995 sports video game developed by Tomcat System and published by Coconuts Japan Entertainment in Japan for the Virtual Boy. In the game, the player assume the role of a robot called Peatron to defeat a group of space pirates that have taken over the planet Animal Star on a intergalactic squash tournament. Its gameplay involves Peatron ricocheting a ball across a three-dimensional court and defeating the opponent on the other side in order to proceed further in the tournament.

First announced at E3 1995, Space Squash was one of four projects under development for the Virtual Boy by Coconuts Japan. The game was met with mixed reception from critics since its release. The title has never been officially released outside Japan, although an English fan translation exists.

Gameplay 

Space Squash is a futuristic squash game played from a third-person perspective where the player assume the role of a robot called Peatron to defeat a group of space pirates that have taken over the planet Animal Star on a intergalactic squash tournament. Peatron begins at the area A-1 and each area in the game has six stages filled with opponents. A boss must be faced on every fifth area and finishing each area allows the player to play an extra bonus round, in addition of choosing the next route. 

During gameplay, the player controls Peatron with the left d-pad, while the right d-pad is used for directional ball shots. Points are won if the opponent misses the ball or his energy is reduced completely. If hit by the ball, an opponent is left stunned and open for scoring. The arena's wall can be used to obtain drifts with the ball. The player can also use special power-ups, which are obtained by hitting boxes scattered in the arena, such as walls to protect Peatron's playing field, speed and health.

Release and reception 

Space Squash was first announced at E3 1995 as one of the four projects under development by Coconuts Japan Entertainment for the Virtual Boy alongside Intercept, Proteus Zone and a 3D shooter. It was developed by Tomcat System. The game was published by Coconuts in Japan on September 28, 1995. The title was also showcased in a playable state at the 1995 Famimaga Earth World show. Although it was not officially released outside Japan, an English fan translation was released in 2015.

Space Squash received a mixture of opinions from critics since its release. Famitsus four reviewers gave the game an overall mixed outlook. Nintendo Magazine System noted that the title made decent use of the Virtual Boys 3D effect but stated that it resembled tennis rather than squash. The Japanese book Virtual Boy Memorial Commemorative Guidebook gave it a negative outlook, noting its low difficulty level and unmotivated character designs but commended the arenas. In contrast, N64 Magazines Jason Moore regarded it as a "very playable" game despite the concept, stating that its opponents offer considerable challenge. Nintendo Lifes Dave Frear commended the use of the 3D effect, stage variety, controls, effective audio and hidden settings but remarked that an additional difficulty setting would have been a welcomed addition.

Notes

References

External links 

 Space Squash at GameFAQs
 Space Squash at MobyGames

1995 video games
Japan-exclusive video games
Single-player video games
Sports video games
Video games about pirates
Video games about robots
Video games developed in Japan
Video games set on fictional planets
Virtual Boy games
Tomcat System games